Mbowe (Esimbowe) is a Bantu language of Zambia. 

Maho (2009) lists K.321 Mbume and K.322 Liyuwa as distinct but closely related languages. Mbowe had once been classified as a dialect of the divergent Luyana language.

References

External links 
 ELAR archive of Preliminary Documentation of Mbowe

Bantu languages
Languages of Zambia
Languages of Namibia
Kavango languages